Rodrigo Rafael (born March 1, 1960) is a Filipino former tennis player. He now lives in New York.

Rafael trained out of the Olivarez Tennis Center in Parañaque and was active on the international tour in the 1980s.

Between 1985 and 1989 he featured in 10 ties for the Philippines Davis Cup team, winning four singles and two doubles rubbers. He was also a medalist for the Philippines in multiple editions of the Southeast Asian Games in the late 1980s.

References

External links
 
 
 

1960 births
Living people
Filipino male tennis players
Southeast Asian Games medalists in tennis
Southeast Asian Games silver medalists for the Philippines
Southeast Asian Games bronze medalists for the Philippines